Ahmet Şahin (born 22 March 1978) is a Turkish footballer who plays as a goalkeeper for Kemerspor. He is currently the captain of Karabükspor, and is a well-known journeyman in Turkey who has played for various teams in various divisions of the Turkish footballing pyramid.

At Samsunspor, he was one of the team's key players during the 2011 season, and was a major factor in their victorious campaign in the Turkish second division.

Honours 
 Kocaelispor
Turkish Cup (1): 2002

References

External links
 
 
 
 

1978 births
Living people
Footballers from Istanbul
Turkish footballers
İstanbul Başakşehir F.K. players
Kocaelispor footballers
Diyarbakırspor footballers
Trabzonspor footballers
Adanaspor footballers
Samsunspor footballers
Elazığspor footballers
Balıkesirspor footballers
Mersin İdman Yurdu footballers
Ankaraspor footballers
Kardemir Karabükspor footballers
Giresunspor footballers
Süper Lig players
TFF First League players
TFF Second League players
Association football goalkeepers